Kahani Eik Raat Ki is a Pakistani thriller anthology television series that was broadcast on ARY Digital during 2012–2013. The broadcast consisted mainly of small horror/romantic/thriller stories in a mini format. The show stars Neelam Muneer, Maria Wasti, Omair Rana, Sajal Aly, Ayeza Khan, Sonya Hussain, Noman Ejaz, Sana Fakhar, Aijaz Aslam, Sohai Ali Abro and many others. The series used to air at 8 P.M. every Fridays.

List of episodes

References 

2012 Pakistani television series debuts
Pakistani drama television series
Urdu-language television shows
Pakistani anthology television series